Axel Jensen (17 September 1899 – 20 August 1968) was a Danish long-distance runner. He competed in the marathon at the 1920 and 1924 Summer Olympics.

References

1899 births
1968 deaths
Athletes (track and field) at the 1920 Summer Olympics
Athletes (track and field) at the 1924 Summer Olympics
Danish male long-distance runners
Danish male marathon runners
Olympic athletes of Denmark
Sportspeople from Odense